WCXN (1170 AM) is a radio station broadcasting a Mexican Regional music format. Licensed to Claremont, North Carolina, United States, the station is currently owned by Birach Broadcasting.

History
In 1989, Don Lee was general manager of WCXN and WPAR-FM, which played Southern gospel music.

In the early 1990s, Robert Barnette, a Taylorsville minister who helped raise money for WPAR, started a show on WCXN. He was soon joined by Dean "Bubba" Lilly. Their "Swap Shop" program could be heard in 17 counties, but it wasn't just the merchandise, described as "tacky." Announcer Jim Stinson said, "We're laughing ourselves silly with Barnette and Lilly."

In August 1997, WCXN switched to Spanish language programming. Soon after that, the station added a Hmong show on Sunday mornings. Just over a year later, the Hmong show had expanded from 90 minutes to four hours. In 2007, Hmong programming aired on Saturday mornings as well.

Birach Broadcasting Corp. bought WCXN from Davidson Media Group LLC in 2007.

References

External links

Asian-American culture in North Carolina
Birach Broadcasting Corporation stations
CXN
Hispanic and Latino American culture in North Carolina
Hmong-American culture and history
Mexican-American culture
CXN
Regional Mexican radio stations in the United States